Michael Charles Zerner (January 1, 1940 – February 2, 2000) was an American theoretical chemist, professor at the University of Guelph from 1970 to 1981 and University of Florida from 1981 to 2000. Zerner earned his Ph.D. under Martin Gouterman at Harvard, working with the spectroscopy of porphyrins. He conceived and wrote a quantum chemistry program, known as BIGSPEC or ZINDO, for calculating electronic spectra of big molecules. In 1996 Zerner was diagnosed with liver cancer, and died on February 2, 2000, survived by his wife and two children.

External links 

 

 

1940 births
2000 deaths
University of Florida faculty
Theoretical chemists
Harvard University alumni
Computational chemists
Academic staff of the University of Guelph
American expatriates in Canada